Ryan Earl Merriman (born April 10, 1983) is an American actor. He began his career at the age of ten and has appeared in several feature films and television shows. He is best known for a handful of Disney Channel original movies and for portraying Jake Pierce in The Ring Two, Kevin Fischer in Final Destination 3, and Ian Thomas in Pretty Little Liars.

Early life
Merriman was born in Choctaw, Oklahoma, the son of Earl and Nonalyn Merriman. He has a sister named Monica. At a young age, he began acting in commercials, print work, vocal performances, and local theater (Stage Struck Studios) in Oklahoma.

Career
Merriman's first major role was on the television series The Mommies, which ran from 1993 to 1995. During the 1990s, he appeared in most episodes of The Pretender as a younger version of Jarod, the series' main character. He has starred in several television films, including Smart House, The Luck of the Irish, and as a young Meyer Lansky in Lansky. He appeared in the 1999 feature film The Deep End of the Ocean, playing the lost son of Michelle Pfeiffer's character, and subsequently starred as the main character, a Jewish boy from the Bronx, in the 2000 film Just Looking. In 2002, he played Adam Eddington in another Disney Channel original movie, A Ring of Endless Light. He then returned to television roles, appearing in Dangerous Child, Taken, and Smallville.

Merriman's other roles include the horror films Halloween: Resurrection (2002), The Ring Two (2005), and Final Destination 3 (2006). He starred in Home of the Giants, a high school drama. He appeared in the CBS miniseries Comanche Moon in January 2008. He played Henry Dunn in the original pilot presentation for Harper's Island, but was replaced by Christopher Gorham when the series was picked up by CBS. From 2010 to 2014, Merriman portrayed Ian Thomas on ABC Family's Pretty Little Liars. In 2012, he starred as Dennis Mack in the 16th episode of Season 2 in Hawaii Five-0.

Dwight Little wanted Merriman to play Jin Kazama in his film Tekken, but Merriman turned it down. He starred in the Hallmark Channel original movie Elevator Girl as Jonathan, a successful young lawyer who finds himself falling for a free-spirited young woman who is way below his pay grade. In 2011, he appeared as linebacker Jon Abbate in The 5th Quarter, a film about the 2006 football season of Wake Forest University.

Personal life
Merriman was married to Micol Duncan from 2004 to 2011. On January 1, 2012, he became engaged to Kristen McMullen. They were married in September 2014. Their daughter was born in July 2018.

Filmography

Film

Television

References

External links

1983 births
Male actors from Oklahoma
American male child actors
American male film actors
American male television actors
Living people
People from Choctaw, Oklahoma
20th-century American male actors
21st-century American male actors